Joseph Priestley College was a further education college founded in 1955 serving the communities of South Leeds, West Yorkshire, England. It was named after Joseph Priestley, the famous scientist and co-discoverer of oxygen who was born nearby. The college had three campuses, in Rothwell, Morley and Beeston.

Following financial problems the college was merged with Leeds City College in August 2011.

Courses offered
The college offered a number of courses including:

Public Services (Uniformed)
Hairdressing
Beauty Therapy
Business
Construction
Horticulture
IT Training
Sport
Basic Skills (English and Maths)
IT Skills 
Childcare
Health and Social Care
Foundation studies (courses for adults with learning difficulties and disabilities) 
Access to Higher Education 
GCSEs (Mathematics and English)
A wide range of full-time, part-time and flexible courses for adults.
Courses for Businesses (including First Aid, Health and Safety, Management Training)

See also 
 Oulton Academy - Joseph Priestley College's Partnership School

External links
 Joseph Priestley College website
Joseph Priestley College Ofsted reports

Educational institutions established in 1955
Educational institutions disestablished in 2011
Defunct universities and colleges in England
Further education colleges in Leeds
1955 establishments in England